Perthshire is an unincorporated community located in Bolivar County, Mississippi, United States along Mississippi Highway 1. Perthshire is located on the Riverside Division of the former Yazoo and Mississippi Valley Railroad. Perthshire was once home to six general stores.

A post office operated under the name Perthshire from 1889 to 1963.

References

Unincorporated communities in Bolivar County, Mississippi
Unincorporated communities in Mississippi